Gang Forever is the debut mixtape by American hip hop collective HBK Gang, founded by rapper Iamsu! The mixtape was released on August 12, 2013.

Overview
HBK Gang released their debut compilation album on August 12, 2013. Titled Gang Forever, it includes 17 rap tracks featuring different members of the collective. Much of the album's production was handled by production team The Invasion; which consists of Iamsu!, P-Lo, Kuya Beats, Jay Ant, and Chief, with assistance from Cardo, AKA Frank, and Sage the Gemini.

Track listing

See also
Kilt II (2013)

References

External links
HBKgang.com

2013 debut albums
The HBK Gang albums
Albums produced by Cardo